Tyringham (/ˈtiːrɪŋəm/) is a village in the unitary authority area of the City of Milton Keynes, Buckinghamshire, England. It is located about a mile and a half north of Newport Pagnell.

The village name is an Old English language word, and means 'Tir's home'. In the Domesday Book of 1086 the village was recorded as Telingham.

There is a theory that the name Tyringham refers to a settlement of Thuringii Germans coming with the Anglo-Saxons in the Dark Ages.

Civil parish
Historically, the parish of "Tyringham with Filgrave" (or "Tyringham cum Filgrave") was first created in 1639 by the union of two parishes.

The modern civil parish is Tyringham and Filgrave, consisting of these two villages and their surrounding area.  At the 2001 census, the population of the parish was 190.

Historically, Tyringham on its own once contained only two houses, but was a village in its own right because it had an ecclesiastic parish.

See also 
 Tyringham Hall
 Tyringham, Massachusetts

References

Bibliography
Victoria County History, Buckinghamshire, vol.4, Tyringham

External links

 
Villages in Buckinghamshire
Milton Keynes